Montreal Impact may refer to:
 CF Montréal, current MLS team, formerly known as Montreal Impact from 2012 to 2020.
 Montreal Impact (1992–2011), the former team that played in the second-tier before becoming the above MLS team.

It may also refer to the various reserve teams of the club.
 Montreal Impact Academy, the academy of the above clubs.
 Montreal Impact U23, the top team of the Academy that previously played in the Premier Development League in 2014.
 FC Montreal, the former reserve team of the above MLS team in 2015 and 2016.